Pouillé or Pouille (without acute accent) may refer to the following places in France:

 Pouillé, Loir-et-Cher, a commune in the Loir-et-Cher department
 Pouillé, Vendée, a commune in the Vendée department
 Pouillé, Vienne, a commune in the Vienne department

Pouillé may also refer to:

 Pouillé (ecclesiastical register)
 Lucas Pouille, French tennis player